East Suffolk was a county constituency in Suffolk, England.  It returned two Members of Parliament to the House of Commons of the Parliament of the United Kingdom.

History

The seat was created under the Reform Act 1832 as one of two divisions, together with the Western Division, of the Parliamentary County of Suffolk. This resulted in a more representative allocation, with a total of four MPs instead of two for the former entire county at large, which still allowed for double voting (or more) of those Forty Shilling Freeholders who also were householders or landlords of any particular boroughs within the county.  This Act retained the four largest boroughs of the seven before 1832, with the three abolished boroughs of Aldeburgh, Dunwich and Orford being absorbed into the Eastern Division.

Further sweeping changes took place as a result of the Redistribution of Seats Act 1885 which saw the 2 two-member Suffolk divisions being replaced by five single-member constituencies. The Eastern Division was largely replaced by the Northern or Lowestoft Division, the North-Eastern or Eye Division and the South-Eastern or Woodbridge Division.

Boundaries
1832–1885: The part of the county of Suffolk not included in the West Suffolk constituency, i.e. the Hundreds of Blything, Bosmere and Claydon, Carlford, Colneis, Hoxne, Loes, Mutford and Lothingland, Plomesgate, Samford, Thredling, Wangford, and Wilford, and the Liberty of Ipswich.

Members of Parliament

Election results

Elections in the 1830s

Elections in the 1840s

Vere's death caused a by-election.

Henniker-Major resigned by accepting the office of Steward of the Manor of Northstead, causing a by-election.

Elections in the 1850s
Thellusson's death caused a by-election.

Gooch's death caused a by-election.

Kelly was appointed Attorney-General for England and Wales, causing a by-election.

Elections in the 1860s

Henniker-Major was elevated to a UK peerage, becoming Lord Hartismere, and Kelly resigned after being appointed Chief Justice of the Court of the Exchequer, causing a by-election for both seats.

Kerrison resigned, causing a by-election.

Elections in the 1870s
Henniker-Major succeeded to the peerage, becoming Lord Hartismere.

Stanhope was appointed a Lord Commissioner of the Treasury, requiring a by-election.

Stanhope succeeded to the peerage, becoming Earl Stanhope and causing a by-election.

Elections in the 1880s

References

Parliamentary constituencies in Suffolk (historic)
Constituencies of the Parliament of the United Kingdom established in 1832
Constituencies of the Parliament of the United Kingdom disestablished in 1885